

The Adams-Wilson Hobbycopter (later named the Adams-Wilson Choppy) is a small, single-seat, open-framework helicopter designed for homebuilding, to be powered by a motorcycle engine.

Design and development
The Adams-Wilson company was formed by T.G. Adams and Paul Wilson to market plans for a simple single-seat helicopter named the HobbyCopter, of which they have built a prototype. This prototype flew successfully for the first time in November 1958. Plans were first marketed in 1958 and have been revised and revived by various designers over the years.

The Hobbycopter, (also colloquially known as the Flying Triumph), was designed to use commonly found materials that were readily available to customers.

The aircraft is available in the form of plans and some key parts for amateur construction from Vortech of Fallston, Maryland.

Variants
Hobbycopter XH-1 The prototype of the one-man open framework homebuilt helicopter powered by a  Triumph motorcycle engine.
Hobbycopter 101Production version of the XH-1 offered as a kit for $900, or as plans for $35 to homebuilders.
Hobbycopter 102Strengthened Model 101 with  Triumph and a fibre-glass cockpit enclosure.

Specifications (Hobbycopter 101)

See also

References

External links

Homebuilt aircraft
1950s United States sport aircraft
1950s United States helicopters
Single-engined piston helicopters
Hobbycopter
Aircraft first flown in 1958